These are lists of active and all-time Major League Soccer (MLS) droughts in the MLS Cup Playoffs, CONCACAF Champions League, U.S. Open Cup, and Canadian Championship. Those teams which have never made it in club history are listed by the season that they entered the league.

Among the current 28 MLS clubs to have completed at least one season, 13 have never won the MLS Cup. The longest MLS Cup drought is jointly held by FC Dallas, New England Revolution, and New York Red Bulls, all of whom have played in every MLS season without ever winning the championship. Among those clubs which have won the MLS Cup, the longest title drought is that of Chicago Fire FC, who have not won the honor since winning MLS Cup 1998. 15 clubs have never won the Supporters' Shield, with Colorado Rapids being the only club to play in every season without ever winning the Shield. Among those clubs who have won the Shield, the longest drought is that of Sporting Kansas City who have not won it since the 2000 Major League Soccer season.

The only team that has never qualified for the post-season tournament is Charlotte FC, who debuted in 2022.

Longest active droughts

MLS Cup Playoffs appearance

Updated through 2022 Major League Soccer season. This list does not include clubs that made the post-season as of that year.

MLS Cup Conference Semifinals appearance

Updated through 2022 Major League Soccer season. This list does not include clubs that reached the Conference Semifinals that year.

MLS Cup Conference Finals appearance

Updated through 2022 Major League Soccer season. Does not include clubs that reached the Conference Finals that year.

MLS Cup Final appearance

Updated through 2022 Major League Soccer season. Does not include clubs that appeared in MLS Cup 2022.

1 Does not include 2006–2007 when San Jose was dormant.

MLS Cup championship

Updated through 2022 Major League Soccer season. Does not include the winner of MLS Cup 2022 (Los Angeles FC).

1 Does not include 2006–2007 when San Jose was dormant.

Supporters' Shield win

Updated through 2022 Major League Soccer season. This list does not include the current holder of the Supporters' Shield (Los Angeles FC).

CONCACAF Champions League appearance

Updated through 2023 CONCACAF Champions League.

1 The first CONCACAF Champions League was in 2008–09. Dates before this reference qualification for the CONCACAF Champions' Cup.
2 Seattle Sounders FC qualified for the 2015-16 Champions League twice by winning both the MLS Cup and Supporters' Shield. Their second berth was passed to the best US-based club in the Supporters' Shield standings not yet qualified.
3 This club qualified for the Champions League through multiple pathways.
4 This club played in another league before joining MLS and could have qualified for the Champions League by winning the U.S. Open Cup. This table only counts their drought from when they joined MLS.
5 Toronto FC won MLS Cup 2017, but were ineligible for the Champions League berth because they are a Canadian club. The berth was passed to the best US-based club in the aggregate 2017 and 2018 MLS Supporters' Shield standings not yet qualified.
6 The 2020 U.S. Open Cup was canceled due to the COVID-19 pandemic. US Soccer decided to award the spot which would ordinarily go to its champion to the previous year's champion.
7 The final of the 2020 Canadian Championship was unable to be held prior to the start of the 2021 champions league due to the COVID-19 pandemic. As a result, Canada Soccer selected Toronto FC, one of the finalists, as Canada's representative.
8 The 2021 U.S. Open Cup was canceled due to the COVID-19 pandemic. US Soccer decided to award the spot which would ordinarily go to its champion to the best US-based club in the Supporters' Shield standings not yet qualified.
9 Los Angeles FC qualified for the 2023 Champions League twice by winning both the MLS Cup and Supporters' Shield. Their second berth was passed to the best US-based club in the Supporters' Shield standings not yet qualified.

Domestic cup championship
Updated through 2022 U.S. Open Cup and 2022 Canadian Championship.

1 Does not include 2020 and 2021 when the U.S. Open Cup was canceled.
2 Does not include 2006–2007 when San Jose was dormant.
3 FC Cincinnati, Minnesota United FC, Nashville SC, and Portland Timbers played in other leagues before joining MLS and competed in the U.S. Open Cup during those years. This table only counts their droughts from when they joined MLS.
4 The final of the 2020 Canadian Championship did not take place until after the conclusion of the 2021 tournament. This table nevertheless treats the 2020 tournament as happening before the 2021 tournament.

Longest all-time droughts
Each list below shows the 20 longest droughts, plus ties, in the given category.

MLS Cup Playoffs appearance

The list only includes MLS clubs that failed to make the playoffs for three or more consecutive seasons. Updated through 2022 Major League Soccer season.

MLS Cup Conference Semifinals appearance
The list only includes clubs that failed to make the conference semifinals for three or more consecutive seasons. Updated through 2022 Major League Soccer season.

MLS Cup Conference Finals appearance
The list only includes clubs that failed to make the conference finals for five or more consecutive seasons. Updated through 2022 Major League Soccer season.

MLS Cup Final appearance
The list only includes clubs that failed to make the MLS Cup final for eight or more consecutive seasons. Updated through 2022 Major League Soccer season.

1 Does not include 2006–2007 when San Jose was dormant.

MLS Cup championship
The list only includes clubs that failed to win an MLS Cup championship for eight or more consecutive seasons. Updated through 2022 Major League Soccer season.

1 Does not include 2006–2007 when San Jose was dormant.

Supporters' Shield win

The list only includes clubs that failed to win a Supporters' Shield for eight or more consecutive seasons. Updated through 2022 Major League Soccer season.

CONCACAF Champions League appearance

The list only includes clubs that failed to qualify for the CONCACAF Champions League for five or more consecutive seasons. Updated through 2023 CONCACAF Champions League.

1 The first CONCACAF Champions League was in 2008–09. Dates before this reference qualification for the CONCACAF Champions' Cup.
2 Does not include the 2007, 2008, and 2008−09 tournaments which San Jose could not qualify for due to being on hiatus.
3 This club played in another league before joining MLS and could have qualified for the Champions League by winning the U.S. Open Cup. This table only counts its drought from when it joined MLS.

Domestic cup championship
The list only includes clubs that failed to win the U.S. Open Cup or Canadian Championship for six or more consecutive seasons. Updated through 2022 U.S. Open Cup and 2022 Canadian Championship.

1 Does not include 2020–2021 when the U.S. Open Cup was canceled.
2 Does not include 2006–2007 when San Jose was dormant.
3 Portland Timbers played in other leagues before joining MLS and competed in the U.S. Open Cup during those years. This table only counts its drought from when it joined MLS.

Metro areas awaiting first MLS Cup

This list includes only metropolitan areas that have a club currently playing in MLS. Updated through 2022 Major League Soccer season.

See also 
 Major League Soccer
 List of Major League Baseball franchise postseason droughts
 List of National Basketball Association franchise post-season droughts
 List of National Football League franchise post-season droughts
 List of National Hockey League franchise post-season droughts

Post-season droughts
MLS, Post-season droughts
Post-season droughts